Guillermo Calles (25 June 1893 – 28 February 1958) was a Mexican film actor, producer and director.

Selected filmography
 Behind Two Guns (1924)
 Dios y Ley (1929) 
 El vuelo de la muerte (1934) 
 Such Is My Country (1937)
 Rosalinda (1945)
 Lola Casanova (1949)
 The Magician (1949)
 The Torch (1950)
 Kill Me Because I'm Dying! (1951)
 Here Comes Martin Corona (1952)

References

Bibliography
 Rogelio Agrasánchez. Guillermo Calles: A Biography of the Actor and Mexican Cinema Pioneer. McFarland, 2010.

External links

1893 births
1958 deaths
Mexican film producers
Mexican male film actors
Mexican male silent film actors
Mexican film directors
Male actors from Chihuahua (state)
20th-century Mexican male actors